Tony Maskill is an Australian photographer.

Biography 
Tony Maskill was born in 1948 in Manchester, England. He worked as the hotel photographer in the Southern Cross in Melbourne while studying photography at Prahran College of Advanced Education.

Works 
Maskill exhibited at the Kodak Gallery and his work was published in the Australian Centre for Photography publication New photography Australia: a selective survey in 1974 edited by Graham Howe. He taught photography at Box Hill College.

References 

Australian photographers
1948 births
Living people